William Chuse, of Dorchester, Dorset, was an English politician.

Family
He married a woman named Alice.

Career
He was a Member (MP) of the Parliament of England for Dorchester in September 1388.

References

Year of birth missing
Year of death missing
English MPs September 1388
Members of the Parliament of England for Dorchester